Teretianax minuta is a species of sea snail, a marine gastropod mollusk in the family Eulimidae.

Distribution
This marine species occurs off Port Alfred, South Africa.

References

 Turton W.H. (1932). Marine Shells of Port Alfred, S. Africa. Humphrey Milford, London, xvi + 331 pp., 70 pls.
 Warén A. (1983) An anatomical description of Eulima bilineata Alder with remarks on and a revision of Pyramidelloides Nevill (Mollusca, Prosobranchia, Eulimidae). Zoologica Scripta 12(4): 273-294

External links
 To World Register of Marine Species

Eulimidae
Gastropods described in 1932